Lücheng Square is a square within Zhengzhou, China, and is the main cultural square within the city.

Tourist attractions in Zhengzhou
Squares in China